Eugenio Meloni (born 28 August 1994 in Cagliari) is an Italian athlete, high jump specialist.

Biography 
In his career he won bronze medal at the European Athletics U23 Championships in Tallinn in 2015. He also has won one time individual national championship.

Achievements

National titles
 Italian Athletics Championships
 High jump: 2017

References

External links
 

1994 births
Italian male high jumpers
Living people
Athletics competitors of Centro Sportivo Carabinieri
20th-century Italian people
21st-century Italian people